Victor William Markov (December 28, 1915 – December 7, 1998) was an American football player.  He played college football for the Washington Huskies. He was elected to the College Football Hall of Fame in 1976. Markov was of Croat origin.

Markov was a unanimous choice as a lineman on the university's centennial team. He earned nine varsity letters in football, wrestling and track and field. After college, he played professional football with the Cleveland Rams in the National Football League before joining the Army.

During World War II, he landed at Normandy as a company commander with Gen. George Patton's Third Army. He earned the Bronze Star, the Purple Heart and five battle stars while fighting in the Battles of the Bulge and the Ardennes.

References

External links
 
 

1915 births
1998 deaths
American football tackles
Cleveland Rams players
Washington Huskies football players
Washington Huskies men's track and field athletes
Washington Huskies wrestlers
College Football Hall of Fame inductees
United States Army personnel of World War II
United States Army officers
Sportspeople from Chicago
Players of American football from Chicago
Track and field athletes from Chicago
American people of Croatian descent
Military personnel from Illinois